Benes Peak is a peak,  high, that is almost entirely snow-covered, situated along the Usas Escarpment,  east of Mount Aldaz, in Marie Byrd Land. It was surveyed by United States Geological Survey on the Executive Committee Range Traverse of 1959, and named by the Advisory Committee on Antarctic Names for Norman S. Benes, a United States Antarctic Research Program meteorologist at Byrd Station, 1961.

References 

Mountains of Marie Byrd Land